Juan Javier Estrada Ruiz (born 8 August 1981, in Chiclana de la Frontera) is a Spanish former professional road racing cyclist. He rode in the 2008 and 2010 Vuelta a España.

References

1981 births
Living people
Spanish male cyclists
People from Chiclana de la Frontera
Sportspeople from the Province of Cádiz
Cyclists from Andalusia